The Vasa Church is a church in Gothenburg, Sweden. It is located in the area of Vasastaden, between Hvitfeldtska gymnasiet and Vasaparken. It was founded in 1909 and is built in a Neo-Romanesque style, of granite that was brought from Bohuslän. It underwent major renovations during 1999 and 2000.

External links
Vasaförsamlingen website
Orgel Vasakyrkan

Churches in Gothenburg
Churches in the Diocese of Gothenburg
20th-century Church of Sweden church buildings